Verrazano may refer to:
Giovanni da Verrazzano, Italian explorer
Verrazzano-Narrows Bridge in New York City
Verrazano Bridge (Maryland)
Jamestown Verrazzano Bridge in Rhode Island
Verrazano (horse), American race horse